Péan de la Villehunault ( — Consolante, Battle of Trincomalee, 3 September 1782)  was a French Navy officer. He fought in the War of American Independence, and taking part in the French operations in the Indian Ocean under Suffren.

Biography 
Péan de la Villehunault joined the Navy as a Garde-Marine on 8 May 1757. He was promoted to Lieutenant on 4 April 1777.

Péan de la Villehunault served as a Lieutenant on the 74-gun Orient. On 2 September 1780, he was promoted to the command of the 32-gun frigate Consolante. In November 1781, he departed France with a division under Bussy, bound for Isle de France (Mauritius). On 9 August 1782 , Consolante made her junction with Suffren's squadron at Batacalo, along with Saint-Michel and Illustre.

Péan de la Villehunault  was killed in action at the  Battle of Trincomalee on 3 September 1782, when a grenade exploded near him.

Sources and references 
 Notes

References

 Bibliography
 
 

French Navy officers